Little Tough Guy is a 1938 crime film that starred several of the Dead End Kids.  In the follow-up films, the studio began using the group name The Little Tough Guys, and later The Dead End Kids and Little Tough Guys.  This was the first of several films and serials that Universal made using several of the "Kids", whom they borrowed from Warner Bros.

Little Tough Guy is in the public domain.

Plot
Johnny Boylan's father was sentenced to death for a crime that he was never fully proven to have committed.  He and his family move to a poorer section of the East Side in New York City.  His sister, Kay resorts to dancing in a burlesque theater after she is fired from her job.  Her former fiancé, Paul Wilson, still cares for her and wants to help her, but she avoids him because of the shame she is feeling.

Johnny tries to enlist his fellow newsboy friends to help prove his father's innocence.  They try to convince the judge, but are unsuccessful.  In frustration, Johnny tosses a brick through the judge's car window, which begins his life of crime.  He enlists his friend "Pig" to help him rob a drugstore.  They are subsequently chased by the police and hide out.  However, the cops find them and Pig begs Johnny to surrender.  Eventually Pig leaves the store and is shot and killed by the police.  Johnny is captured and sent to reform school.

Cast

The Dead End Kids
Billy Halop as Johnny Boylan
Huntz Hall	as "Pig"
Gabriel Dell as "String"
Bernard Punsly as "Ape"
David Gorcey as "Sniper"
Hally Chester as "Dopey"

Additional cast
Robert Wilcox as Paul Wilson
Helen Parrish as Kay Boylan
Marjorie Main as Mrs. Boylan
Jackie Searl as Cyril Gerrard
Peggy Stewart as Rita Belle
Helen MacKellar as Mrs. Wanamaker
Edward Pawley as Jim Boylan
Olin Howland as Baxter
Pat C. Flick as Peddler

Home media
The film was released on DVD on July 22, 2003.

References

External links
 
 
 

1938 films
American black-and-white films
Universal Pictures films
Films directed by Harold Young (director)
American crime films
1938 crime films
1930s English-language films
1930s American films